The Marriage Game (Swedish: Äktenskapsleken) is a 1935 Swedish comedy drama film directed by Ragnar Hyltén-Cavallius and starring Zarah Leander, Gösta Cederlund and Harry Roeck-Hansen.

The film's art direction was by Arne Åkermark.

Cast
 Zarah Leander as Tora Diidiken  
 Gösta Cederlund as Chief editor Nordenson, her 1st husband
 Harry Roeck-Hansen as Statsrådet Ström, her 2nd husband
 Ragnar Widestedt as Direktör Melin, her 3rd husband
 Einar Axelsson as Gunnar Grahn, her 4th husband 
 Elsa Carlsson as Polly, her friend
 Karl-Gerhard as Hjalmar Gregorsson, her lawyer
 Karin Swanström as Carolina Berg  
 Åke Ohberg as Per-Olof, her son  
 Rune Carlsten as Riksdagsman Larsson  
 Maritta Marke as Märta, his daughter 
 John Norrman as Sund 
 Emmy Albiin as Curious Lady at the Square  
 Anna-Lisa Baude as Maria, Housemaid  
 Gillis Blom as a Journalist  
 Ernst Brunman as Nilsson, Hairdresser  
 Karl-Ewert Christenson as Guest at Tora's Party  
 Agnes Clementsson as Miss Andersson 
 Nils Dahlgren as Guest at Tora's Party  
 Carl Deurell as Vicar 
 Nils Ekstam as Juror  
 Hartwig Fock as Postman at the Meeting  
 Margarete Fries as Die Stimme fuer Zarah Leander 
 Anna-Lisa Fröberg as Guest at Tora's Party 
 Hjördis Gille as Woman in Broköping  
 Karin Granberg as Guest at Tora's Party  
 Wilhelm Haqvinius as Man at the Meeting  
 John Hilke as Man at the Meeting 
 Per Hugo Jacobsson as Man at the Meeting 
 Helge Kihlberg as Man in Broköping  
 Signe Lundberg-Settergren as Guest at Tora's Party  
 Hugo Lundström as Customer at the Hairdresser's  
 Wilma Malmlöf as Curious Lady at the Square  
 Anna Olin as Vicar's Wife  
 Knut Pehrson as Juror  
 Algot Persson as Man at the Meeting  
 Olav Riégo as Guest at Tora's Party  
 Erik Rosén as Professor Sköldvall  
 Anna-Lisa Ryding as Young Woman  
 Holger Sjöberg as Guest at Tora's Party  
 Georg Skarstedt as Guest at Tora's Party 
 Ingeborg Strandin as In Broköping 
 Ruth Weijden as Melin's Housemaid  
 John Westin as Juror  
 Lisa Wirström as Guest at Carolina Berg's Dinner

References

Bibliography 
 Jutta Jacobi. Zarah Leander: das Leben einer Diva. Hoffmann und Campe, 2006.

External links 
 

1935 films
1930s Swedish-language films
Films directed by Ragnar Hyltén-Cavallius
Swedish comedy-drama films
1935 comedy-drama films
Swedish black-and-white films
1930s Swedish films